Kenny Niemach (born in South Africa) is a South African retired footballer.

References

South African soccer players
Association football forwards
Mamelodi Sundowns F.C. players
Living people
Year of birth missing (living people)